Timoleon Razelos (born 1903, date of death unknown) was a Greek sailor. He competed in the Star event at the 1952 Summer Olympics.

References

External links
 

1903 births
Year of death missing
Greek male sailors (sport)
Olympic sailors of Greece
Sailors at the 1952 Summer Olympics – Star
Sailors (sport) from Athens